The 1978–79 Utah State Aggies men's basketball team represented Utah State University as a member of the Pacific Coast Athletic Association during the 1978–79 men's college basketball season. The Aggies were led by head coach Dutch Belnap and played their home games at the Dee Glen Smith Spectrum in Logan, Utah. After finishing second in the conference regular season standings, Utah State received an at-large bid to the NCAA Tournament where they lost in the first round to Southern California.

Roster

Schedule and results

|-
!colspan=12 style=| Regular season

|-
!colspan=12 style=|PCAA tournament

|-
!colspan=12 style=|NCAA Tournament

Notes

References 

Utah State Aggies men's basketball seasons
Utah State Aggies men's basketball
Utah State Aggies men's basketball
Utah State
Utah State